Tooz District is a district in the north-eastern part of Saladin Governorate, Iraq. Its main settlement is the city of Tuz Khurmatu. Other towns include Sulaiman Bek, Yankjah, and Amirli. Its population is predominantly Turkmen. The district's name is in the Turkmen dialect, meaning 'salt.'

References

Districts of Saladin Governorate